The Petit lac Wayagamac is located in the city of La Tuque, in Mauricie, in Quebec, in Canada. Until 2006, the territory of this lake was part of the former unorganized territory of Petit-Lac-Wayagamac, before being merged with La Tuque. The territory of the lake is controlled by the Zec de la Bessonne.

Geography 
These two lakes are surrounded by the Laurentians (mountains) mountains, certain peaks exceeding 400 meters above sea level.

This Haute-Mauricie lake includes Bouleau Bay (which receives Bouleau Creek from the north) and Mystérieur Bay located at the mouth of the Mysterious River (coming from the south).

 Little Bostonnais River 

From the outlet of Petit lac Wayagamac, the Petite Rivière Bostonnais (English: Little Bostonnais River) runs  (measured by water) before emptying into Lake Wayagamac (southeast side).

Toponymy 
According to Father G. Lemoine, the expression "waweia gamak" is akin to the Algonquin language, and means "at the round lake". For father Joseph-Étienne Guinard, waiagamak, put for wawiagamaw, has the meaning of a round lake. Yet its shape is more triangular than round. This name, in the form of Wayagamack was mentioned in 1876 in one of the reports of the surveyor Télésphore Chavigny De La Chevrotière. From 1913, Wayagamack identified a pulp and paper factory established in Trois-Rivières.

The toponym "Petit lac Wayagamac" was officially registered on December 5, 1968, in the Place Names Bank of the Commission de toponymie du Québec.

In addition, Kruger, in partnership with the Société générale de financement du Québec (SGF Rexfor), acquired the Kruger Wayagamack plant in 2001. This plant is located on Île-de-la-Potherie, at Trois-Rivières.

See also 
 List of lakes of Canada

References 

Lakes of Mauricie
La Tuque, Quebec